Nicolas Mahut was the defending champion, but did not complete in the Juniors this year.

Roman Valent defeated Gilles Müller in the final, 3–6, 7–5, 6–3 to win the boys' singles tennis title at the 2001 Wimbledon Championships.

Seeds

  Janko Tipsarević (third round)
  Gilles Müller (final)
  Bruno Echagaray (first round)
  Brian Dabul (first round)
  Alejandro Falla (third round)
  Wang Yeu-tzuoo (semifinals)
  Ytai Abougzir (first round)
  Florian Mayer (second round)
  Robin Söderling (second round)
  Roman Valent (champion)
  Lamine Ouahab (first round)
  Luciano Vitullo (third round)
  Stéphane Bohli (third round)
  Lionel Noviski (third round)
  Paul Capdeville (second round)
  Todd Reid (quarterfinals)

Draw

Finals

Top half

Section 1

Section 2

Bottom half

Section 3

Section 4

References

External links

Boys' Singles
Wimbledon Championship by year – Boys' singles